Maurice Hugh Keen  (30 October 1933 – 11 September 2012) was a British historian specializing in the Middle Ages. His father had been the Oxford University head of finance ('Keeper of the University Chest') and a fellow of Balliol College, Oxford, and after schooling at Winchester College, Maurice became an undergraduate there in 1954. He was a contemporary and lifelong friend of Tom Bingham, later the Senior Law Lord, as well as of the military historian, Sir John Keegan, whose sister Mary he married.

Keen's first success came with the writing of The Outlaws of Medieval Legend while still a junior research fellow at The Queen's College, Oxford, 1957–1961. He was elected a tutorial fellow of Balliol in 1961, retaining his fellowship until his retirement in 2000, when he was elected a fellow emeritus. He also served as junior dean (1963–68), tutor for admissions (1974–1978), and vice-master (1980–83).

In 1984, Keen won the Wolfson History Prize for his book Chivalry. The book redefined in several ways the concept of chivalry, underlining the military aspect of it.

Keen was elected a Fellow of the British Academy, a Fellow of the Royal Historical Society, and a Fellow of the Society of Antiquaries of London.

He appears in the 1989 fictional novel The Negotiator by Frederick Forsyth.

He was an enthusiastic governor of Blundell's School in Tiverton for many years, the school being linked to Balliol by a scholarship and fellowship foundation gift.

Selected works

 (1965) The Laws of War in the Late Middle Ages, Routledge & K. Paul
 (1967) A History of Medieval Europe, Routledge Kegan & Paul, 
 (1973) England in the Later Middle Ages, London: Methuen, 
 (1978) The Outlaws of Medieval Legend Univ of Toronto Press, 
 (1984) Chivalry, USA: Yale University Press 
 (1986) Some Late Mediaeval Views on Nobility, University of London, 
 (1996) Nobles, Knights and Men-at-arms in the Middle Ages, Hambledon Continuum, 
 (1999) Medieval Warfare: A History. Oxford University Press
 (2002) Origins of the English Gentleman, Stroud: Tempus, 
 (2010) Chivalry, London : The Folio Society

See also
A History of England
The Negotiator (novel)

References

External links
Portrait at Balliol web site

1933 births
2012 deaths
British medievalists
Fellows of Balliol College, Oxford
Fellows of the British Academy
Fellows of the Royal Historical Society
Fellows of the Society of Antiquaries of London
Officers of the Order of the British Empire